Mohamed Aman bin Haji Abdul Rahim (born 23 June 1996) is a Bruneian football player who currently plays for Kasuka FC in the Brunei Super League.

International career
Aman made his international debut for Brunei in a 6-1 loss to Cambodia in November 2015. He has also represented the under 18, under 19 and under 23 sides.

Career statistics

International

References

Living people
1996 births
Bruneian footballers
Brunei international footballers
Association football defenders
Competitors at the 2015 Southeast Asian Games
Competitors at the 2017 Southeast Asian Games
Southeast Asian Games competitors for Brunei